Naboa is a genus of moths of the family Erebidae. The genus was described by Nye in 1975.

Species
Naboa cataleuca (Herrich-Schäffer, [1858]) - Amazon River
Naboa semialba (Walker, 1862) - Brazil

References

Hypeninae